Pedro Alvarez may refer to:

Pedro Álvarez de Toledo, Marquis of Villafranca (1484–1553), Spanish viceroy of Naples
Pedro Alvarez de Acosta (1484–1563), Catholic Bishop of Osma
Pedro Álvares Cabral (c. 1468–1520), Portuguese navigator
Pedro de Toledo, 1st Marquis of Mancera (1585–1654), Spanish general and viceroy of Peru
Pedro Álvarez Castelló (1967–2004), Cuban painter
Pedro Álvarez (baseball) (born 1987), Dominican professional baseball player
Pedro Álvarez (footballer) (born 1970), Colombian association football player
Pedro J. J. Alvarez, Nicaragua engineer
Pedro Mario Álvarez (born 1982), Spanish footballer